Cauria is an archaeological site in Corsica. It is located in the commune of Sartène.

References

Archaeological sites in Corsica